Saint-Robert is a municipality southeast of Sorel-Tracy in the Regional county municipality of Pierre-De Saurel, in Montérégie, Quebec. The population as of the Canada 2011 Census was 1,794. About 20 meteorites from the St-Robert meteorite shower were found here.

Demographics

Population
Population trend:

Language
Mother tongue language (2006)

See also
List of municipalities in Quebec

References

Municipalities in Quebec
Incorporated places in Pierre-De Saurel Regional County Municipality
Populated places established in 1857
1857 establishments in Canada